Vincent Ferniot (born July 14, 1960) is a French actor, television presenter and culinary writer.

Early life
Vincent Ferniot was born on July 14, 1960, in Neuilly-sur-Seine, France. His parents, Jean Ferniot and Christiane Collange, are journalists and authors. He is of Jewish-Prussian descent on his maternal side.

Ferniot graduated from the École nationale supérieure des arts décoratifs.

Career
Ferniot started his career as a singer and guitar player for Les Civils, a rock'n'roll band. He subsequently became an actor, starring in Le bunker de la dernière rafale and Adieu Blaireau 1985, followed by Agent Trouble in 1987.

Ferniot was a radio contributor on France Inter, Europe 1 and RTL. He went on to become a presenter on France 2 and Canal+. Since 2015, he has presented Midi en France, a culinary programme on France 3.

Ferniot is the author of several books about food. He is the vice president of the Association Amicale des Amateurs d'Andouillette Authentique. He was described by Le Figaro as a "bon vivant".

Works

References

External links

1960 births
Living people
People from Neuilly-sur-Seine
French people of German-Jewish descent
French people of Polish-Jewish descent
École nationale supérieure des arts décoratifs alumni
20th-century French male actors
French food writers
French television presenters